The 2018 NC State Wolfpack men's soccer team represented North Carolina State University during the 2018 NCAA Division I men's soccer season.  The Wolfpack were led by head coach George Kiefer, in his second season. They played home games at Dail Soccer Field. NC State finished the season with a 10–7–3 (2–4–2) record and earned a berth into the NCAA Tournament, where they lost to Maryland in the second round.

Background

The 2017 NC State men's soccer team finished the season with an 8–6–4 overall record and a 3–3–2 ACC record.  The Wolfpack were seeded eight–overall in the 2017 ACC Men's Soccer Tournament, where they lost to Virginia Tech in the first round.  The Wolfpack earned an at-large bid into the 2017 NCAA Division I Men's Soccer Tournament.  In the tournament, the Wolfpack lost to Old Dominion in the first round.

At the end of the season, one Wolfpack men's soccer player was selected in the 2018 MLS SuperDraft: Caleb Duvernay.

Player Movement

Players Leaving

Players Arriving

Squad

Roster

Updated August 3, 2018

Team Management

Source:

Schedule

Source:

|-
!colspan=8 style=""| Exhibition

|-
!colspan=7 style=""| Regular season

|-
!colspan=7 style=""| ACC Tournament

|-
!colspan=7 style=""| NCAA Tournament

Awards and honors

2019 MLS SuperDraft

NC State did not have any players selected in the 2019 MLS SuperDraft.

Rankings

References

NC State Wolfpack men's soccer seasons
NC State Wolfpack
2018 in sports in North Carolina
NC State Wolfpack
NC State